Boots! Boots! is a 1934 British comedy film directed by Bert Tracy and starring George Formby, Beryl Formby, and Arthur Kingsley. It was made by Blakeley's Productions, Ltd. (later Mancunian Films) at the Albany Studios in London. The premiere of the film was in Burslem, Stoke-on-Trent.

Cast
 George Formby - John Willie
 Beryl Formby - Snooky
 Arthur Kingsley - Hotel Manager
 Tonie Forde - Chambermaid
 Lilian Keyes - Lady Royston
 Donald Read - Sir Alfred Royston
 Constance Fletcher - Mrs Clifford
 Betty Driver - Betty
 Wallace Bosco - Mr Clifford
 Myfanwy Southern - Reception Clerk
 Bert Tracey - The Chef
 Harry Hudson and his Orchestra - Themselves

Outline
Producer John E. Blakeley had no prior experience in film production; he had seen comedian George Formby doing his stage act and approached him to star in a feature film. Blakeley's modest studio was a one-room loft space above a taxi garage. The makeshift stage was not soundproofed, so whenever the crew members wanted to film a scene, they had to signal the garage to stop its noisy work below. The studio also had pictorial limitations, and couldn't replicate much more than simple room interiors (many scenes were staged in cramped corners). Thus the nightclub scenes in Boots! Boots! were filmed in near-darkness, hiding the absence of set decorations, with a single spotlight trained on the performer being photographed.

The film is a patchwork of songs and jokes tied to the misadventures of bumbling John Willie, played by Formby. ("John Willie" was a character made famous by Formby's father, George Formby, Sr., in music halls of the early 1900s.) Despite the crude photography and recording, and the minuscule budget of £3,000, Boots! Boots! became an enormous hit. It was reissued in 1938, in a shortened 55-minute form, to capitalize on Formby's later fame; for six decades this abridged version was the only one in circulation, until an uncut, 80-minute print was located and restored for DVD release.

References

Bibliography
 Richards, Jeffrey. The Age of the Dream Palace. Routledge & Kegan, 1984.

External links

 Boots! Boots! at the George Formby Society

1934 films
1934 comedy films
British comedy films
Films shot in Greater Manchester
British black-and-white films
1930s English-language films
1930s British films